1,2-alpha-mannosidase may refer to:
 alpha-Mannosidase, an enzyme
 Mannosyl-oligosaccharide 1,2-alpha-mannosidase, an enzyme